Roborough Castle is an Iron Age enclosure or hill fort situated close to Lynton in Devon, England. The fort is situated on the North East edge of a Hillside forming a promontory above a tributary to the East Lyn River known as Hoaroak Water at approx 320 Metres above Sea Level.

References

Hill forts in Devon
Lynton and Lynmouth